Mahonia Hall is the official residence of the governor of Oregon, located in Oregon's capital city, Salem. The building was acquired by the state in 1988 with private donations. It is also known as the T. A. Livesley House or Thomas and Edna Livesley Mansion, after its original owners. The house was renamed Mahonia Hall after the scientific name of the Oregon-grape, Mahonia aquifolium, Oregon's state flower. A naming contest was held by The Oregonian in 1988, and Eric Johnson, a 13-year-old from Salem, came up with the winning entry. Other finalists were The Eyrie, Trail's End, The Oregon House, and The Cascade House. Governor Neil Goldschmidt and his family were the first official residents.

The half-timber Tudor-style mansion was designed and built in 1924 by Ellis F. Lawrence, the founder of the University of Oregon School of Architecture, for hop farmer Thomas A. Livesley. The structure includes a ballroom on the third floor, a pipe organ, a wine cellar and formal gardens; all were part of the original design. The home has  of space. Mahonia Hall was added to the National Register of Historic Places in 1990.

See also
National Register of Historic Places listings in Marion County, Oregon

References

External links
Historic images of Mahonia Hall from Salem Public Library
Images of Mahonia Hall from Building Oregon: Architecture of Oregon & the Pacific Northwest

Oregon
Government buildings in Oregon
Houses completed in 1924
1924 establishments in Oregon
Houses on the National Register of Historic Places in Salem, Oregon
Tudor Revival architecture in Oregon
Governor of Oregon